(in sections also called Eilbek) is a river flowing through Schleswig-Holstein and Hamburg, Germany.

The Wandse rises west of the village of Siek in Kreis Stormarn in Schleswig-Holstein and ends in the center of Hamburg in the Alster. Along the banks of the Wandse there were many water mills. The river passes through the settlements of Siek, Braak, Stapelfeld, and Hamburg.

After passing through the Mühlenteich pond, the river continues as Eilbek (later Eilbekkanal), eponymous to the Eilbek district. The canal joins the Alster in the heart of Hamburg at Außenalster.

Meander restoration
The River Wandse is a site of interest for river management and conservation due to a pioneering project carried out in 1982 to restore the original meanders to an engineered section of the river flowing through the national park.

See also
List of rivers of Schleswig-Holstein
List of rivers of Hamburg
 List of bridges in Hamburg

References

Wandsbek
Rivers of Hamburg
Rivers of Schleswig-Holstein
Rivers of Germany